Sandra Leigh Bolton (born 3 March 1964) is an Australian politician. She has been the Independent member for Noosa in the Queensland Legislative Assembly since 2017.

She is a graduate of Central Queensland University.

Bolton was one of the original councillors when the Shire of Noosa was de-amalgamated in 2013. She narrowly missed out on being elected as mayor in 2016.

Her partner is lawn bowls champion Ian Schuback.

References

1964 births
Living people
Members of the Queensland Legislative Assembly
Independent members of the Parliament of Queensland
Women members of the Queensland Legislative Assembly
21st-century Australian politicians
21st-century Australian women politicians